Wellington Mill is a locality in the Ferguson River valley, in the Greater Bunbury sub-region of South West region of Western Australia.

History

In 1881 a timber mill was established in the area. In 1896 the Canning Jarrah Timber Company established a timber mill and town at Wellington Mill, which when established was the largest private timber town in Western Australia. The timber mills closed in 1929 and a fire destroyed most of the town in 1950.

Attractions

Gnomesville

Gnomesville is a tourist attraction comprising a collection of over 3,000 gnomes statues next to the intersection of Wellington Mill Road, Wellington-Lowden Road and Ferguson Road.

It began in 1995 when gnomes were placed in the intersection in protest of the construction of a roundabout, and has been added to by visitors over time.

See also

References 

South West (Western Australia)